Fossil stellar magnetic fields or fossil fields are proposed as possible interstellar magnetic fields that became locked into certain stars.

See also
 Stellar magnetic field

References

Magnetism in astronomy
Stellar astronomy